Smoke and Mirrors is a studio album by American rapper O.C. of the D.I.T.C. crew. It was released on Hieroglyphics Imperium Recordings on November 1, 2005.

Critical reception

Jim Durig of IGN wrote, "'My Way' is indicative of the album's lyrical edge, touting that O.C. is 'still tougher than your illest rap adolescent' over a blend of sharp strings and frantic, piercing keys." Dave Heaton of PopMatters commented that "Somehow the most retro songs on the album end up sounding the freshest, proving that maybe O.C. is as complicated as he claims to be."

Track listing

Personnel
Credits adapted from the CD edition's liner notes.

 O.C. – vocals
 Mike Loe – production (1–11, 13–17), recording (1–11, 13–17)
 Fyre Dept. – production (12)
 Rashawn Ross – trumpet (12)
 Eric Krasno – guitar (12)
 Eric Coomes – bass guitar (12)
 Adam Deitch – drums (12), keyboards (12)
 Ramon – recording (12), mixing (1–17)
 Mr. Dave – production (18)
 Roc-Steady – production (18)
 Lamonte – recording (18)
 Kasim – mixing (18)
 Craig Salmon – photography
 Jireh Hinton – design
 Sam Wilson – additional design

References

External links
 

2005 albums
O.C. (rapper) albums
Hieroglyphics Imperium Recordings albums